The Solidarity Movement (Kinima Allilengyi) is a Greek Cypriot nationalist party in Cyprus. It was founded in 2016 by Eleni Theocharous.

Theocharous departed the conservative Democratic Rally in November 2015, in protest to their support of a bizonal, bifederal settlement to the Cyprus problem. She established the Solidarity Movement in January 2016 and right-wing Evroko merged with the party in March of the same year. The Solidarity Movement is contesting 56 seats in the 2016 Cypriot legislative election.

On 9 March 2016, Eleni Theocharous joined the Alliance of European Conservatives and Reformists, after she retired from the Democratic Rally and the European People's Party. The party lost its one and only seat on 26 May 2019, in the 2019 European Parliament election.

Electoral results

House of Representatives

References

External links
Official Website

Political parties in Cyprus
Greek Cypriot nationalism
Political parties established in 2016
2016 establishments in Cyprus
2010s in Cypriot politics